The Standards Commission for Scotland is an independent body that has the purpose of advancing high ethical standards in public life. Its main tool is the promotion and enforcement of Codes of Conduct for councillors (approved by the Scottish Parliament) and those appointed to devolved public bodies.

The Standards Commission is concerned with ethical conduct. It deals with complaints of misconduct against individual members. It does not deal with issues of maladministration; these are matters for the Scottish Public Services Ombudsman.

The Commission was established under the Ethical Standards in Public Life etc. (Scotland) Act 2000.  The Commission Members are appointed by the Scottish Parliament but are expected to be independent of government in its workings. The current convener is Kevin Dunion.

Codes of Conduct
The Commission provide guidance and training on the application of the Codes to assist in promoting high standards of conduct.

The Commission publishes a Code of Conduct for Councillors, which sets out the standards of behaviour expected of councillors in Scotland. The first version came into force in May 2003. The most recent version came into force on 21 December 2015. Local authorities are encouraged also to establish their own codes of conduct (consistent with the Standards Commission's) and to enforce these codes themselves.

There is a model code of conduct produced for members of devolved bodies.

Commission membership
The Commission comprises a Convener and four Commission Members who are appointed by the Scottish Parliament. Kevin Dunion is the current Convener, taking up the position on 1 February 2017.

The Commissioner for Ethical Standards in Public Life in Scotland
In addition to the Commission, the Ethical Standards in Public Life etc. (Scotland) Act 2000 established the office of the Commissioner for Ethical Standards in Public Life in Scotland (formerly known as the Chief Investigating Officer).  The Commissioner is not a part of the Commission but has a duty to investigate complaints of misconduct referred to him.  He is not entirely independent though; he must comply with any directions given by the Commission, which may not however direct him as to how to carry any particular investigation out.

Public Bodies under the Standards Commission's Supervision
The Commission has authority over:
 
32 local authorities and 105 other public bodies. Community councils are not under this authority.

The Devolved Public Bodies over which the Commission has authority are:
 
 The Accounts Commission for Scotland
 The Crofters Commission
 The Deer Commission for Scotland
 Highlands and Islands Enterprise
 The Parole Board for Scotland
 Scottish Agricultural Wages Board
 The Scottish Conveyancing and Executry Services Board
 The Scottish Criminal Cases Review Commission
 The Scottish Environment Protection Agency
 Scottish Enterprise
 The Royal Commission on the Ancient and Historical Monuments of Scotland
 The National Galleries of Scotland Board of Trustees 
 The Royal Botanic Garden, Edinburgh Board of Trustees
 The Scottish Arts Council
 Scottish Natural Heritage
 The Trustees of the National Library of Scotland
 The National Museums of Scotland Board of Trustees
 The Scottish Tourist Board
 Area tourist boards
 41 Colleges of further education
 The Scottish Further Education Funding Council
 The Scottish Higher Education Funding Council
 The Scottish Qualifications Authority
 The Clinical Standards Board for Scotland
 The NHS National Services Scotland
 Healthcare Improvement Scotland
 14 NHS Health boards
 NHS Health Scotland
 The Health Technology Board for Scotland
 The Mental Welfare Commission for Scotland
 Scottish Ambulance Service Board
 The NHS Education for Scotland
 Scottish Hospital Endowments Research Trust
 The Scottish Medical Practices Committee
 The State Hospitals Board for Scotland
 Scottish Children's Reporter Administration
 Scottish Homes
 The Scottish Legal Aid Board
 The Scottish Sports Council
 The Water Authorities

See also
 Standards Board for England
 Adjudication Panel for England
 Northern Ireland Ombudsman

References

External links
 

Local government in Scotland
Ombudsmen in Scotland
Scottish commissions and inquiries
2002 establishments in Scotland
Government agencies established in 2002